Seri Tanjung Pinang is a residential neighbourhood within the city of George Town in Penang, Malaysia.

The ongoing reclamation of Seri Tanjung Pinang is expected to be completed by end of 2027. At the time of writing, Seri Tanjung Pinang is home to a handful of retail complexes, most notably Straits Quay and a Lotus's outlet.

History 
The Seri Tanjung Pinang project was first mooted in the 1980s, during the tenure of the then Chief Minister of Penang, Lim Chong Eu. The project is split into two phases, with land reclamation for Phase 1 commencing in the 1990s. However, the land reclamation was put on hold following the 1997 Asian financial crisis.

Having acquired the site in 2003, Eastern & Oriental Berhad resumed the development of the first phase. In spite of the increasing costs, the  Seri Tanjung Pinang Phase 1 was completed by 2005.

The land reclamation of Phase 2 was scheduled for completion by 2018 but as of 2023 is still not completed due to financing difficulties.

Transportation 
Seri Tanjung Pinang is served by Rapid Penang's Congestion Alleviation Transport (CAT) Tanjung Tokong route, a free-of-charge transit service within Tanjung Tokong. In addition, the Hop-On Hop-Off bus service also includes a stop at Straits Quay.

Shopping 

Straits Quay, a marina-cum-shopping mall within the neighbourhood, was completed in 2010. Aside from containing over 100 retail lots, the marina consists of 40 pontoon berths designed to accommodate small recreational boats. The mall also houses the Performing Arts Centre of Penang (Penangpac) and a convention centre.

In addition, a Lotus's hypermarket within the neighbourhood was launched in 2011, making it the third such hypermarket on Penang Island.

See also 
 Tanjung Tokong

References

External links
Seri Tanjung Pinang
Seri Tanjung Pinang 2

Neighbourhoods in George Town, Penang